Rapacuronium bromide (brand name Raplon) is a rapidly acting, non-depolarizing aminosteroid neuromuscular blocker formerly used in modern anaesthesia, to aid and enable endotracheal intubation, which is often necessary to assist in the controlled ventilation of unconscious patients during surgery and sometimes in intensive care. As a non-depolarizing agent it did not cause initial stimulation of muscles before weakening them.

Due to risk of fatal bronchospasm it was withdrawn from the United States market by Organon on March 27, 2001, less than 2 years after its FDA approval in 1999.

References

Muscle relaxants
Nicotinic antagonists
Withdrawn drugs
Quaternary ammonium compounds
1-Piperidinyl compounds
Acetate esters
Propionate esters
Androstanes
Neuromuscular blockers